Old Princes Highway may refer to:

 Old Princes Highway, South Australia, superseded sections of Highway 1 from Adelaide to Tailem Bend
 Old Princes Highway, Victoria, superseded sections of Highway 1 from Berwick to Morwell